Martín Leonel Cicotello (born 14 May 1981)  is an Argentine football manager and former player who played as a forward. He is the current manager of Arsenal de Sarandí along with Carlos Ruiz.

Playing career
Born in Santa Fe, Cicotello was a youth graduate of hometown side Unión de Santa Fe. Due to his Italian passport, he moved to the country in 2002, and started playing for Eccellenza side Sporting Genzano.

Aside from a one-year spell at Serie D side Lavello, Cicotello only played for Eccellenza sides during his career. He represented , Fasano, Spal Lanciano, L'Aquila, Fermana, Mosciano, Turris and Correggese.

Coaching career
After retiring, Cicotello returned to his native country and joined Deportivo Español in 2013, as a youth coach. He left the club in the following year to work as an assistant manager at San Jorge de Tucumán, and later moved to South Korea to coach Sancheong HS.

Back to Argentina in 2015, Cicotello was an assistant at Central Norte, before joining San Telmo's youth sides in the following year. In September 2016, he was named as an assistant of José Santos Romero at All Boys, while being in charge of the reserve team.

Cicotello left All Boys in May 2017, and joined Christián Lovrincevich's staff at Peruvian side Juan Aurich, as his assistant. In November, however, he returned to his native country to become a youth coordinator at his first club Unión.

Cicotello left Unión on 28 May 2018, and subsequently became one of Frank Darío Kudelka's assistants at Universidad de Chile. He continued to work with Kudelka at Newell's Old Boys and Huracán, also acting as an interim manager of the latter in April 2021 after Kudelka tested positive for COVID-19.

On 24 November 2022, Cicotello was appointed manager of the reserve side of Defensa y Justicia. The following 2 January, however, he became the manager of Arsenal de Sarandí along with Carlos Ruiz, after his former duo Luca Marcogiuseppe resigned.

References

External links
 Calcio Marche profile 
 
 

1981 births
Living people
Argentine people of Italian descent
Footballers from Santa Fe, Argentina
Argentine footballers
Serie D players
Eccellenza players
U.S.D. Città di Fasano players
L'Aquila Calcio 1927 players
Fermana F.C. players
Association football forwards
Argentine expatriate footballers
Argentine expatriate sportspeople in Italy
Expatriate footballers in Italy
Argentine football managers
Arsenal de Sarandí managers
Argentine expatriate sportspeople in South Korea
Argentine expatriate sportspeople in Peru
Argentine expatriate sportspeople in Chile